In graph theory, a graph amalgamation is a relationship between two graphs (one graph is an amalgamation of another).  Similar relationships include subgraphs and minors. Amalgamations can provide a way to reduce a graph to a simpler graph while keeping certain structure intact. The amalgamation can then be used to study properties of the original graph in an easier to understand context. Applications include embeddings, computing  genus distribution, and Hamiltonian decompositions.

Definition 

Then we say that  is an amalgamation of  if there is a bijection  and a surjection  and the following hold:

Note that while  can be a graph or a pseudograph, it will usually be the case that  is a pseudograph.

Properties 
Edge colorings are invariant to amalgamation. This is obvious, as all of the edges between the two graphs are in bijection with each other.

Example 

The invariance of edge coloring and Hamiltonian Decomposition can be seen clearly. The function  is a bijection and is given as letters in the figure. The function  is given in the table below.

Hamiltonian decompositions 
One of the ways in which amalgamations can be used is to find Hamiltonian Decompositions of complete graphs with 2n + 1 vertices. The idea is to take a graph and produce an amalgamation of it which is edge colored in  colors and satisfies certain properties (called an outline Hamiltonian decomposition).  We can then 'reverse' the amalgamation  and we are left with  colored in a Hamiltonian Decomposition.

In  Hilton outlines a method for doing this, as well as a method for finding all Hamiltonian Decompositions without repetition. The methods rely on a theorem he provides which states (roughly) that if we have an outline Hamiltonian decomposition, we could have arrived at it by first starting with a Hamiltonian decomposition of the complete graph and then finding an amalgamation for it.

Notes

References 
 Bahmanian, Amin; Rodger, Chris (2012), "What Are Graph Amalgamations?", Auburn University
 Hilton, A. J. W (1984), "Hamiltonian Decompositions of Complete Graphs, Journal of Combinatorial Theory, Series B 36, 125–134
 Gross, Jonathan L.; Tucker, Thomas W.  (1987),   Topological Graph Theory, Courier Dover Publications, 151
 Gross, Jonathan L. (2011),  "Genus Distributions of Cubic Outerplanar Graphs",  Journal of Graph Algorithms and Applications, Vol. 15, no. 2, pp. 295–316

Graph theory